The 2015 Long Beach ePrix was a Formula E motor race held on 4 April 2015 in Long Beach, United States on a revised version of a street circuit usually used for the Grand Prix of Long Beach. It was the sixth championship race of the single-seater, electrically powered racing car series' inaugural season.

China Racing driver Nelson Piquet Jr. became the sixth different winner in as many races, and as a result moved up to second place in the drivers' championship, one point in arrears of Audi Sport ABT's Lucas di Grassi. Di Grassi also finished in the podium placings, in third place, just behind Andretti driver Jean-Éric Vergne. Nicolas Prost (e.dams-Renault) held the lead of the championship into the weekend, finished down in 14th position after serving a drive-through penalty.

Report

Background
For the first time in the championship, the driver lineup was exactly the same as for the previous race in Miami. Fanboost was awarded to Nelson Piquet Jr., Jean-Éric Vergne and Sam Bird. Attendance at the free event was approximately 23,000.

Classification

Qualifying

Race

Notes
 – Two points for fastest lap.
 – Three points for pole position.

Standings after the race

Drivers' Championship standings

Teams' Championship standings

 Notes: Only the top five positions are included for both sets of standings.

References

External links
 Official results

|- style="text-align:center"
|width="35%"|Previous race:2015 Miami ePrix
|width="30%"|FIA Formula E Championship2014–15 season
|width="35%"|Next race:2015 Monaco ePrix
|- style="text-align:center"
|width="35%"|Previous race:N/A
|width="30%"|Long Beach ePrix
|width="35%"|Next race:2016 Long Beach ePrix
|- style="text-align:center"

Long Beach ePrix
Long Beach ePrix
ePrix, Long Beach
Long Beach ePrix